See also Ski Patrol (disambiguation)

Ski Patrol is a 1940 American war film directed by Lew Landers, produced by Ben Pivar and Warren Douglas and released by Universal Pictures. It is known to be the only Hollywood film about the Winter War between Finland and the Soviet Union.

Two rival skiers competing in the 1936 Olympics, one Russian and one Finn, are pitted against each other just a few years later, as the Russians attack the Finnish border in the Winter War, and the Finnish heroes defend a snow-laden mountain pass. The plot takes great historical liberties in its storyline. E.g. all "Finnish" uniforms and insignias are wrong.

Cast 
 Philip Dorn as Lt. Viktor Ryder
 Luli Deste as Julia Engel
 Stanley Fields as Birger Simberg
 Samuel S. Hinds as Capt. Per Vallgren
 Edward Norris as Paavo Luuki
 John Qualen as Gustaf Nerkuu
 Hardie Albright as Tyko Gallen
 John Arledge as Dick Reynolds
 John Ellis as Knut Vallgren
 Henry Brandon as Jan Sikorsky
 Kathryn Adams Doty as Lissa Ryder
 Leona Roberts as Mother Ryder
 Abner Biberman as Russian Field Commander
 Wade Boteler as German Olympics Spokesman
 Addison Richards as James Burton, speaker
 Reed Hadley as Ivan Dubroski

References

External links 
 
 Turner Classic Movies page

1940 films
Films directed by Lew Landers
World War II films made in wartime
Universal Pictures films
Films set in Finland
Winter War in popular culture
Films about the 1936 Winter Olympics
Films about Olympic skiing
American black-and-white films
American war films
1940 war films
American skiing films
1940s English-language films